Nimishillen Creek is a tributary of Sandy Creek, 24.5 miles (39.4 km) long, in northeastern Ohio. Via Sandy Creek and the Tuscarawas, Muskingum and Ohio Rivers, it is part of the watershed of the Mississippi River, draining an area of 187 square miles (484 km²), including the city of Canton.

Geography 
Nimishillen Creek flows on both glaciated (in the north) and unglaciated (in the south) portions of the Allegheny Plateau, in Stark and Tuscarawas Counties. It is formed in Canton by the confluence of the East Branch Nimishillen Creek and the Middle Branch Nimishillen Creek. The East Branch is 10.4 miles (16.7 km) long and flows through Louisville; the Middle Branch is 16.6 miles (26.6 km) long. Shortly downstream of this confluence, the stream collects the West Branch Nimishillen Creek, which is nine miles (14.5 km) long and flows through North Canton and Canton. From Canton, Nimishillen Creek flows generally southwardly, past East Sparta, into northern Tuscarawas County, where it flows into Sandy Creek from the north.

Names
According to one tradition, the name "Nimishillen" is derived from a Native American language meaning "black alder".

According to the Geographic Names Information System, Nimishillen Creek has also been known historically as:
Memenshehelas Creek 	
Nanashehelas Creek 	
Nemenshehela Creek 	
Nemenshehelas Creek 		
Nenenchelus Creek 	
Nimishillen Run 	
Nine Shilling Creek

See also
List of rivers of Ohio

References 

Rivers of Ohio
Rivers of Stark County, Ohio
Rivers of Tuscarawas County, Ohio
Allegheny Plateau
Canton, Ohio